2024 aluminium alloy is an aluminium alloy, with copper as the primary alloying element. It is used in applications requiring high strength to weight ratio, as well as good fatigue resistance. It is weldable only through friction welding, and has average machinability. Due to poor corrosion resistance, it is often clad with aluminium or Al-1Zn for protection, although this may reduce the fatigue strength.  In older systems of terminology, 2XXX series alloys were known as duralumin, and this alloy was named 24ST.

2024 is commonly extruded, and also available in alclad sheet and plate forms. It is not commonly forged (the related 2014 aluminium alloy is, though).

Basic properties 

2024 aluminium alloy's composition roughly includes 4.3–4.5% copper, 0.5–0.6% manganese, 1.3–1.5% magnesium and less than a half a percent of silicon, zinc, nickel, chromium, lead and bismuth.

Chemical composition 
The alloy composition of 2024 is:
 Silicon no minimum, maximum 0.5% by weight
 Iron no minimum, maximum 0.5%
 Copper minimum 3.8%, maximum 4.9%
 Manganese minimum 0.3%, maximum 0.9%
 Magnesium minimum 1.2%, maximum 1.8%
 Chromium no minimum, maximum 0.1%
 Zinc no minimum, maximum 0.25%
 Titanium no minimum, maximum 0.15%
 Other elements no more than 0.05% each, 0.15% total
 Remainder aluminium (90.7–94.7%)

Mechanical properties 
The mechanical properties of 2024 depend greatly on the temper of the material.

2024-O 
2024-O temper aluminium has no heat treating. The material has elongation (stretch before ultimate failure) of 10–25%, this is the allowable range per applicable AMS specifications.

2024-T3 
It has an elongation of 10–15%.

2024-T4 
Solution treated at foundry and naturally aged.

2024-T5 
Cooled from hot working and artificially aged (at elevated temperature)

2024-T351 
It has elongation of 20%.

Uses 
Due to its high strength and fatigue resistance, 2024 is widely used in aircraft, especially wing and fuselage structures under tension. Additionally, since the material is susceptible to thermal shock, 2024 is used in qualification of liquid penetrant tests outside of normal temperature ranges.

References

Further reading
 "Properties of Wrought Aluminium and Aluminium Alloys: 2024, Alclad 2024", Properties and Selection: Nonferrous Alloys and Special-Purpose Materials, Vol 2, ASM Handbook, ASM International, 1990, pp. 70–71.

Aluminium alloy table 

2024
Aluminium–copper alloys